The cold blob in the North Atlantic (also called the North Atlantic warming hole) describes a cold temperature anomaly of ocean surface waters, affecting the Atlantic Meridional Overturning Circulation (AMOC) which is part of the thermohaline circulation, possibly related to global warming-induced melting of the Greenland ice sheet.

General

AMOC is driven by ocean temperature and salinity differences. The major possible mechanism causing the cold ocean surface temperature anomaly is based on the fact that freshwater decreases ocean water salinity, and through this process prevents colder waters sinking. Observed freshwater increase originates probably from Greenland ice melt.

Research

2015 and earlier

Climate scientists Michael Mann of Penn State and Stefan Rahmstorf from the Potsdam Institute for Climate Impact Research suggested that the observed cold pattern during years of temperature records is a sign that the Atlantic Ocean's Meridional overturning circulation (AMOC) may be weakening. They published their findings, and concluded that the AMOC circulation shows exceptional slowdown in the last century, and that Greenland melt is a possible contributor.  Tom Delworth of NOAA suggested that natural variability, which includes different modes, here namely the North Atlantic Oscillation and the Atlantic Multidecadal Oscillation through wind driven ocean temperatures are also a factor. A 2014 study by Jon Robson et al. from the University of Reading concluded about the anomaly, "...suggest that a substantial change in the AMOC is unfolding now." Another study by Didier Swingedouw concluded that the slowdown of AMOC in the 1970s may have been unprecedented over the last millennium.

2016
A study published in 2016, by researchers from the University of South Florida, Canada and the Netherlands, used GRACE satellite data to estimate freshwater flux from Greenland. They concluded that freshwater runoff is accelerating, and could eventually cause a disruption of AMOC in the future, which would affect Europe and North America.

Another study published in 2016, found further evidence for a considerable impact from sea level rise for the U.S. East Coast. The study confirms earlier research findings which identified the region as a hotspot for rising seas, with a potential to divert 3–4 times higher than the global average sea level rise rate. The researchers attribute the possible increase to an ocean circulation mechanism called deep water formation, which is reduced due to AMOC slow down, leading to more warmer water pockets below the surface. Additionally, the study noted: "Our results suggest that higher carbon emission rates also contribute to increased [sea level rise] in this region compared to the global average".

Background

In 2005, British researchers noticed that the net flow of the northern Gulf Stream had decreased by about 30% since 1957. Coincidentally, scientists at Woods Hole had been measuring the freshening of the North Atlantic as Earth becomes warmer. Their findings suggested that precipitation increases in the high northern latitudes, and polar ice melts as a consequence. By flooding the northern seas with excessive fresh water, global warming could, in theory, divert the Gulf Stream waters that usually flow northward, past the British Isles and Norway, and cause them to instead circulate toward the equator. Were this to happen, Europe's climate would be seriously impacted.

Don Chambers from the USF College of Marine Science mentioned, "The major effect of a slowing AMOC is expected to be cooler winters and summers around the North Atlantic, and small regional increases in sea level on the North American coast." James Hansen and Makiko Sato stated, "AMOC slowdown that causes cooling ~1°C and perhaps affects weather patterns is very different from an AMOC shutdown that cools the North Atlantic several degrees Celsius; the latter would have dramatic effects on storms and be irreversible on the century time scale." Downturn of the Atlantic meridional overturning circulation, has been tied to extreme regional sea level rise.

Measurements

Since 2004 the RAPID program monitors the ocean circulation.

See also

Abrupt climate change
The Blob (Pacific Ocean)
Deglaciation
Physical impacts of climate change

References

External links 
Extended lecture by Stefan Rahmstorf about AMOC slowdown (May 27, 2016)
A Nasty Surprise in the Greenhouse (video about the shutdown of the thermohaline circulation, 2015)
Blizzard Jonas and the slowdown of the Gulf Stream System (RealClimate January 24, 2016)

Ice sheets
Effects of climate change
Physical oceanography
Chemical oceanography
Anomalous weather